Remigia Salazar (1805–1860) was a Filipina writer, editor and printer. She is known as the first woman in the Philippines to be an editor, the owner and manager of a printing press and a publisher. She was also the founder of the first newspaper in the Philippines (1846).

References 

1805 births
1860 deaths
19th-century Filipino women writers
19th-century businesswomen
19th-century newspaper publishers (people)